Essays, Moral, Political, and Literary (1758) is a two-volume compilation of essays by David Hume. Part I includes the essays from Essays, Moral and Political, plus two essays from Four Dissertations. The content of this part largely covers political and aesthetic issues. Part II includes the essays from Political Discourses, most of which develop economic themes. The total two-part collection appeared within a larger collection of Hume's writings titled Essays and Treatises on Several Subjects. This was a collaborative publication with the important Scottish bookseller Alexander Kincaid, with whom the bookseller Andrew Millar had a lucrative but sometimes difficult relationship.

Content:
 My Own Life, by David Hume
 Letter from Adam Smith, L.L.D. to William Strahan, Esq.
 Part I, Essay I, OF THE DELICACY OF TASTE AND PASSION
 Part I, Essay II, OF THE LIBERTY OF THE PRESS
 Part I, Essay III, THAT POLITICS MAY BE REDUCED TO A SCIENCE
 Part I, Essay IV, OF THE FIRST PRINCIPLES OF GOVERNMENT
 Part I, Essay V, OF THE ORIGIN OF GOVERNMENT
 Part I, Essay VI, OF THE INDEPENDENCY OF PARLIAMENT
 Part I, Essay VII, WHETHER THE BRITISH GOVERNMENT INCLINES MORE TO ABSOLUTE MONARCHY, OR TO A REPUBLIC
 Part I, Essay VIII, OF PARTIES IN GENERAL
 Part I, Essay IX, OF THE PARTIES OF GREAT BRITAIN
 Part I, Essay X, OF SUPERSTITION AND ENTHUSIASM
 Part I, Essay XI, OF THE DIGNITY OR MEANNESS OF HUMAN NATURE
 Part I, Essay XII, OF CIVIL LIBERTY
 Part I, Essay XIII, OF ELOQUENCE
 Part I, Essay XIV, OF THE RISE AND PROGRESS OF THE ARTS AND SCIENCES
 Part I, Essay XV, THE EPICUREAN
 Part I, Essay XVI, THE STOIC
 Part I, Essay XVII, THE PLATONIST
 Part I, Essay XVIII, THE SCEPTIC
 Part I, Essay XIX, OF POLYGAMY AND DIVORCES
 Part I, Essay XX, OF SIMPLICITY AND REFINEMENT IN WRITING
 Part I, Essay XXI, OF NATIONAL CHARACTERS
 Part I, Essay XXII, OF TRAGEDY
 Part I, Essay XXIII, OF THE STANDARD OF TASTE
 Part II, Essay I, OF COMMERCE
 Part II, Essay II, OF REFINEMENT IN THE ARTS
 Part II, Essay III, OF MONEY
 Part II, Essay IV, OF INTEREST
 Part II, Essay V, OF THE BALANCE OF TRADE
 Part II, Essay VI, OF THE JEALOUSY OF TRADE
 Part II, Essay VII, OF THE BALANCE OF POWER
 Part II, Essay VIII, OF TAXES
 Part II, Essay IX, OF PUBLIC CREDIT
 Part II, Essay X, OF SOME REMARKABLE CUSTOMS
 Part II, Essay XI, OF THE POPULOUSNESS OF ANCIENT NATIONS
 Part II, Essay XII, OF THE ORIGINAL CONTRACT
 Part II, Essay XIII, OF PASSIVE OBEDIENCE
 Part II, Essay XIV, OF THE COALITION OF PARTIES
 Part II, Essay XV, OF THE PROTESTANT SUCCESSION
 Part II, Essay XVI, IDEA OF A PERFECT COMMONWEALTH
 Part III, Essay I, OF ESSAY-WRITING
 Part III, Essay II, OF MORAL PREJUDICES
 Part III, Essay III, OF THE MIDDLE STATION OF LIFE
 Part III, Essay IV, OF IMPUDENCE AND MODESTY
 Part III, Essay V, OF LOVE AND MARRIAGE
 Part III, Essay VI, OF THE STUDY OF HISTORY
 Part III, Essay VII, OF AVARICE
 Part III, Essay VIII, A CHARACTER OF SIR ROBERT WALPOLE
 Part III, Essay IX, OF SUICIDE
 Part III, Essay X, OF THE IMMORTALITY OF THE SOUL

References

External links 
Four of the Essays, slightly modified for easier reading

1758 books
Books by David Hume
Ethics books
Books in political philosophy
Essay collections
Aesthetics books
1758 in Scotland
Political history of Scotland
Economic history of Scotland
Philosophy essays